The Best Of Baccara - Original Hits is a compilation album by Spanish duo Baccara issued by mid-price label Paradiso.

This compilation includes recordings by the original formation of the duo, Mayte Mateos and María Mendiola, taken from their RCA-Victor studio albums Baccara (1977), Light My Fire (1978), Colours (1979), Bad Boys (1981) and the greatest hits collection The Hits Of Baccara (1978), licensed from BMG-Ariola.

The track listing is identical to 1995's BMG-Ariola compilation Golden Stars.

Track listing

 "Yes Sir, I Can Boogie"  (Dostal - Soja)  - 4:35
 "Sorry, I'm a Lady"  (Dostal - Soja)  - 3:39
 "Darling" (7" Edit)  (Dostal - Soja)  - 5:26
 "Parlez-Vous Français?"  (Dostal - Soja - Zentner)  - 4:30
 "The Devil Sent You To Lorado"  (Dostal - Soja)  - 4:03
 "Body-Talk"  (Dostal - Soja)  - 4:38
 "Ay, Ay Sailor"  (Dostal - Soja)  - 3:50
 "My Kisses Need A Cavalier"  (Dostal - Soja)  - 4:52
 "Baby, Why Don't You Reach Out?" / "Light My Fire" (Edited version) (Dostal - Soja) (Densmore - Krieger - Manzarek - Morrison)  - 4:45
 "Yummy, Yummy, Yummy"  (Levine - Resnick)  - 3:35
 "Bad Boys"  (Sacher)  4:23
 "Heart, Body and Soul"  (Sacher)  - 4:11
 "Ohio"  (Sacher)  - 3:05
 "Mucho, Mucho"  (Sacher)  - 3:26
 "Woman to Woman"  (Sacher)  - 3:30
 "Boogaloo"  (Sacher)  - 2:40
 "Colorado"  (Sacher)  - 3:33
 "Spend The Night"  (Sacher)  - 3:09

Personnel
 Mayte Mateos - vocals
 María Mendiola - vocals

Production
 Produced and arranged by Rolf Soja.
 Tracks  11 - 18 arranged by Bruce Baxter, produced by Graham Sacher.

Track annotations
 Tracks 1 & 2 from 1977 studio album Baccara.
 Tracks 2, 3, 8 & 10 from 1978 studio album Light My Fire.
 Track 5 from 1978 compilation The Hits Of Baccara.
 Track 9 edited version taken from 1978 compilation The Hits Of Baccara. Full-length version appears on album Light My Fire.
 Tracks 6 & 7 from 1979 studio album Colours.
 Tracks 11 - 18 from 1981 studio album Bad Boys.

References

Baccara albums
2001 greatest hits albums
Bertelsmann Music Group compilation albums